Tityang is a village development committee in Baglung District in the Dhaulagiri Zone based in the wetlands of central Nepal.

References

Populated places in Baglung District